Study of History may refer to:
A Study of History, a 12-volume book by British historian Arnold J. Toynbee, finished in 1961
Historiography, the study of history